No. 16 Martin Street was a 1916 American silent Short film directed by Lloyd B. Carleton. The film was based on the detective story and screen adaptation by Bess Meredyth. The  drama stars Dorothy Davenport, Emory Johnson, and an all-star cast of Universal contract players.

This story tells how a distinguished criminologist with the cooperation of a cabaret singer investigates a local homicide. In true detective style, the pair develops a series of planned undertakings attempting to snare the dope addicts and unravel the murder motive. The moviegoer sees first-hand the threat posed by the Dope evil. The partners find the critical evidence and solve the murder mystery. After solving the crime, the criminologist, along with the cabaret singer, becomes a crime-fighting unit.

Universal released the film on July 13, 1916.

Plot

Cleo hopes to pursue a career in music. Attending the music conservatory has proved costly, and soon the expenses overwhelmed her. No longer able to afford her musical education, she drops out of school and returns home. Looking for a job, she reads a job advertisement for singers at the Follies Cabaret. She interviews for the job, and the show's manager hires her.

Jacques Fournier is one of the foremost criminologists in the country. One day while researching a case, his office door flies open, and a man named Browne rushes into the office. He tells Fournier he has discovered his wife's dead body in their home. He pleads with Fournier to investigate this murder. Fournier agrees, and he accompanies the man to his home.

They enter the house and find Browne's wife lying dead on the floor. Browne points out all of her valuable jewels are missing. Upon further investigation, Fournier determines a spiess gun was used to murder Mrs. Browne. He assures Browne he will investigate the matter and returns to his office. After checking his records, he learns Brown is a cocaine addict. He also determines Mr. Browne, and a woman named Audrey Devine share a mysterious link. Audrey is a singer at the Follies Cabaret. Fournier decides he will talk to Devine and see if she can shed any light on the murder.

Between acts, they expected the cabaret performers to share drinks with the paying customers. Fournier enters the Follies Cabaret and sits down. He notices a patron is harassing one of the young performers. He strides over and rescues the girl from the man's advances. She thanks him profusely and tells him her name is Cleo. Cleo pours out her heart to Fournier, including why she had to abandon her studies at the conservatory. Fournier tells her she can earn some extra cash by assisting him with an investigation. Cleo readily agrees. He asks her if she knows Audrey Devine. Cleo tells Fournier she has seen her in the dressing room and knows Audrey is hooked on cocaine. Fournier thinks there might be a link between Browne and Audrey because of their mutual cocaine addiction. He asks Cleo to imitate a dope addict and to ask Audrey where she gets her dope.

The bell sounds, and Cleo returns to the stage for her second show. After the show's conclusion, she finds Audrey sitting alone. Cleo pretends she is desperate to get some cocaine. She asks Audrey if she knows anywhere she can get some coke. Audrey says she knows someone and calls Max the piano player. When they visit Max, he gives Cleo a deck of coke.
Cleo later informs Fournier that Max is Audrey's drug source. Fournier devises a plan to determine Max's supplier. After working out the details, he leaves a note for Cleo. The note instructs her to make advances toward Max and persuades him to escort her to his home. While they are heading towards Max's home, Fournier will impersonate a crook and try to rob them. During the mugging, Fournier will force Max to identify his drug supplier. She follows his instructions to the letter, but a fight breaks out during the fake robbery attempt. Max escapes but leaves his coat on the ground. Fournier scrutinizes the coat and finds cocaine decks and a note addressed to "16 Martin Street."

Audrey arrives at a home on 16 Martin Street. She walks inside and greets Max and Joe. Joe turns out to be another cocaine addict. Both men are preparing decks of cocaine. Then Audrey goes through a secret panel and delivers some cocaine decks to someone waiting outside. Once finished with her work, she gets ready to leave.

On the same morning, Cleo, in disguise, heads out to 16 Martin Street. Cleo reaches the address, just as Audrey is just leaving, but Audrey does not recognize the disguised Cleo. When Cleo enters the room, she finds the room deserted.

Fournier has left her a powerful fake narcotic and skeleton key. He has instructed her to replace the fake narcotic for the cocaine. Since no one is around, she starts swapping the narcotic for the real dope. 
Completing her mission, she looks around the room. She discovers the secret panel and is about to investigate further when Joe returns. Cleo tells Joe she found they had left the panel door open, and she was merely was peeking in. Cleo exits the house and goes home to preparations for her show that evening.

Night comes, and Fournier waits at the police station to see what Cleo has uncovered. While Fournier waits for Cleo, plainclothes men are watching 16 Martin Street. The plain cloth men observe Audrey and Max enter the house.  
After finishing her last show, Cleo goes directly to the police station. She meets Fournier and tells him everything she has discovered. They decide to head to 16 Martin Street immediately. Once they arrive, they surround the house, and Cleo leads them to the front door. They break down the door and find Max and Joe high on cocaine. The police arrest the two, then Cleo shows them the secret panel. After breaking into the private room, they find Audrey and Browne locked in an embrace. After a brief struggle, the police take Browne into custody. Cleo helps Fournier search the rest of the premises.

Cleo finds some loose boards on the floor, and after prying the boards, finds the weapon used to kill Mrs. Browne. Lying alongside the weapon are the dead woman's missing jewels. Fournier confronts Browne with the gun and missing gems. Seeing his story falling apart, Brown confesses to the murder of his wife. As a reward for her outstanding work in the field, Cleo becomes Fournier's associate.

Cast

Production

Pre-production

Development

If Bess Meredyth needed inspiration for this movie's storyline, she needed to look no further than the pamphlet quoted in the box. The "Dope" evil was a scourge sweeping Hollywood and the country in 1916. Drug use and debauchery would peak in Hollywood in the 1920s. Hollywood made hundreds of films based on drug use and their associated crimes. The reader will notice this movie covered the pamphlet's cocaine warnings of  "homicide" and "loss of moral and social sense."

According to the book - The Story, Carl Laemmle (1867-1939) produced around 91 movies in 1916.
Lloyd B. Carleton (–1933) started working for Carl Laemmle in the Fall of 1915. Carleton arrived with impeccable credentials, having directed some 60 films for the likes of Thanhouser, Lubin, Fox, and Selig. 
Between March and December 1916, 44-year-old Lloyd Carleton directed 16 movies for Universal, starting with The Yaqui and ending with The Morals of Hilda. Emory Johnson acted in all 16 of these films. Of Carleton's total 1916 output, 11 were feature films, and the rest were two-reel shorts.

In 1916, Carleton directed all 13 films pairing Dorothy Davenport and Emory Johnson. This film would be the seventh in the 13-film series. These totals show Carl Laemmle was clearly giving the Davenport-Johnson pairing one of his elite directors from the working cadre of universal directors to produce the screen chemistry Laemmle was seeking.

Casting
All players in this film were under contract with Universal.
Dorothy Davenport (1895-1977) was an established star for Universal when the  year-old actress played Cleo. She had acted in hundreds of movies by the time she starred in this film. The majority of these films were 2-reel shorts, as was the norm in Hollywood's teen years. She had been making movies since 1910. She started dating Wally Reid when she was barely 16, and he was 20. They married in 1913. After her husband died in 1923, she used the name "Mrs. Wallace Reid" in the credits for any project she took part in. Besides being an actress, she would eventually become a film director, producer, and writer.
Emory Johnson (1894-1960) was  years old when he starred in this movie as Jacques Fournier. Carl Laemmle of Universal Film Manufacturing Company thought he saw great potential in Johnson, so he chooses him to be Universal's new leading man. Laemmle's hope was Johnson would become another Wallace Reed. A major part of his plan was to create a movie couple that would sizzle on the silver screen. Laemmle thought Dorothy Davenport and Emory Johnson could create the chemistry he sought. Johnson and Davenport would complete 13 films together. They started with the successful feature production of Doctor Neighbor in May 1916 and ended with The Devil's Bondwoman in November 1916. After completing the last movie, Laemmle thought Johnson did not have the screen presence he wanted. He decided not to renew his contract.  Johnson would make 17 movies in 1916, including 6 shorts and 11 feature-length Dramas. 1916 would become the second-highest movie output of his entire acting career. Emory acted in 25 films for Universal, mostly dramas with a sprinkling of comedies and westerns.
Gretchen Lederer (1891-1955) was a  year-old actress when she landed this role as Audrey Devine. Lederer was a German actress getting her first start in 1912 with Carl Laemmle.  At the time of this film, she was still a Universal contract actress. She had previously acted in two Bosworth-Johnson projects preceding this movie - The Yaqui and Two Men of Sandy Bar. She would unite with Emory Johnson in the 1916 productions of A Yoke of Gold and The Morals of Hilda.
Alfred Allen (1866-1947) was  years old when he played Brown. He got his start in the film industry at Universal city in 1913.  He landed his first role in 1915. His roles were character parts, and he played mostly fathers, villains, or ranch owners. Alfred Allen appeared in 69 features from 1916 through 1929. After making Heartaches, he would appear in four more Davenport-Johnson projects: A Yoke of Gold, The Unattainable, The Human Gamble and Barriers of Society.
Jack Abbot  (1886-1964) was  years old when he played Max. Jack was an actor, eventually becoming a writer and assistant director. The bulk of his roles during his acting career were in short subjects. He spent all of 1916 under contract with Universal. This role was his only known associateship with Lloyd B. Carleton production in 1916.

Screenplay
Bess Meredyth (1890-1969) was  years old when she created the screenplay for this film. She would become one of the most successful women screenwriters of her time. She began as a short story writer for various newspapers, then became an extra at D.W. Griffith's Biograph Studios in New York. She moved to Los Angeles in 1911. Meredyth worked as an actress, subsidizing her income with screenwriting. She wrote stories or screenplays for 24 movies in 1916. Between 1914 and 1920, she wrote two hundred original stories while she worked at Universal. It should also be noted; she was one of the original 36 founders of the Academy of Motion Picture Arts and Sciences.

Filming

Alternate title
The official copyrighted title of this photoplay is No. 16 Martin Street.

There is no known reference of the working title for this film. There are newspapers and magazine listings of:
Number 16 Martin Place
No. 16 Martin Place
16 Martin Street

Post production

Based on an American Film Institute standard, films with a running time of forty minutes or longer are considered feature films.

By 1915, feature films were starting to become more the trend in Hollywood. While advertising this film, a Universal ad is shown in the graphic, also expounds on short films.
The moving picture business is here to stay. That you must admit despite carping critics and blundering sore-heads. True, some exhibitors have found business so good lately — but if you get down to facts when you look for a reason why, it's a 100 to 1 shot that they are, and for some time have been, dallying with a feature program. Some of these wise ones will tell you that business has picked up since they went into features, — BUT — ask them whether they are talking NET or GROSS. They will find they have an immediate appointment and terminate your queries unceremoniously. Funny how we like to kid ourselves, isn't it? The man who is packing 'em in and losing money on features is envied by his competitor, who is laying by a bit every day, and has a good steady, dependable patronage but admits to a few vacant seats at some performances. When this chap wakes up, he will realize that he has a gold mine and that good advertising will make it produce to capacity. The moral is that if you can tie up to the Universal Program, DO IT. If you can't NOW, watch your first chance. Let the people know what you have, and let the feature man go on to ruin if he wants to. You should worry!

Studio
The movie was filmed at the studio complex at Universal Studios located at 100 Universal City Plaza in  Universal City, California

Music
As part of Universal's in-house publication The Moving Picture Weekly, a section was devoted to proposing musical selections for specific movies. The musical selections were "Specially Selected and Compiled by M. Winkler." The music recommended for this film were:
LAEMMLE— "No. 16 Martin Street"....(Two Reels)
REEL I.
1. "Esperanza," by Johnstone, until scene, "Newspaper clipping.
2. "Melody," by Friml, until the cabaret scene.
3. "Oh, My Love," by Monaco, until scene, "Stage entrance." 
4. "InCupid'sNet," Armand.
REEL II.
5. Continue "In Cupid's Net" until "Closing time." 
6. "Dream Shadows," by Langey, to action, pp. or ff., until scene, "No. 16 Martin Street."
7. "Agitato, No. 6," by Lake, pp. until the end.

Release and reception

Official release
The copyright was filed with U.S. Copyright Office and entered into the record as shown:
NO. 16 MARTIN STREET. Laemmle. 1916.
2 reels.
Credits: Bess Meredyth; producer, Lloyd
B. Carleton.
(c)Universal Film Mfg. Co., Inc.; 3Jul16;
LP8634
This film was officially released on July 13, 1916.

Advertising

In Universal's trade journal magazine, The Moving Picture Weekly a new advertising section was started titled - 
PUTTING IT OVER. The section heading reads as follows:
Are you "Putting 'em Over," friend Exhibitor? Are you taking advantage of this new department of advertising suggestions and making a noise in your town that echoes in the tinkle of coins at the box office?
The July 1, 1916 issue of The Moving Picture Weekly had the following advertising suggestions for 16 Martin Street:
<blockquote>A detective story that immediately suggests a Sherlock Holmes make-up as illustrated. Get a man dressed in a long and loud Ulster coat or Mackintosh, with a long mustache, a fore-and-aft cap, a big pipe, and a placard on his back with the name of the photoplay as shown. On his breast, let him show a placard with your theatre name and date. People will see that first as they meet him. and they will turn to rubber, getting a flash at the title then.</blockquote>

The newspaper ad displayed in the film's infobox shows No. 16 Martin Street playing with two other films. The details of the other two films are:
Adele Farrington and Pat Rooney starring the one-reel comedy The Belle & the Bell Hop. 
 Lucille Young and Jack Nelson starring the one-reel drama A Man's Hardest Fight. 
Referencing "The Universal Program" detailed above, this is an example of a "diversified program."

Reviews
Lengthy detailed reviews for short films were not commonplace in 1916. The trade journals devoted lengthy critical reviews, and detailed plot outlines to feature films while giving short films abbreviated summaries and reviews. Unlike other short movies, No. 16 Martin Street was favored with several long film reviews. Critical reaction to the film seemed mostly favorable, as seen below.

In the July 15, 1916 issue of the Moving Picture News,  quoted from the Tabloid Reviews for the Busy Exhibitor:
Detective pictures, much on the order of detective stories, are either good or bad - there is no between.  No. 16 Martin Street is good. It holds the attention every minute, which is the best thing that can be said of it.

In the July 15, 1916 issue of The Moving Picture World,  quoted from the  section - Comments on the Films - Exclusively by our own Staff:
Dorothy Davenport does pleasing work as the girl who aids the detective. The story deals with sordid types but is well handled and makes altogether quite a strong offering.

In the July 8, 1916 issue of The Moving Picture Weekly,'' a slightly biased review published in the Universal weekly film periodical states:
NO. 16 MARTIN ST. combines two significant phases of modern life; one is the rise of the science of criminology, and the other the prevalence of a new vice, the "dope" evil. In this picture, the "movie fan" is given a treat that has long been known to the readers of A. Conan Doyle and Craig Kennedy. In addition, the cover of metropolitan life is ripped off, and the seamy side is laid bare. A drama of vice and crime and their detection.

Preservation status

A report created by film historian and archivist David Pierce for the Library of Congress claims:
75% of original silent-era films have perished.
14% of the 10,919 silent films released by major studios exist in their original 35mm or other formats.
11% survive in full-length foreign versions or on film formats of lesser image quality. Many silent-era films did not survive for reasons as explained on this Wikipedia page.

All known copies of this film are lost.

Gallery

Notes

References

Further reading

External links

Katchmer, George A. A Biographical Dictionary of Silent Film Western Actors and Actresses, McFarland, 2002, p. 204.
Holmstrom, John. The Moving Picture Boy: An International Encyclopaedia from 1895 to 1995, Norwich, Michael Russell, 1996.
List of Universal Pictures films (1912–1919)
Universal Pictures
List of American films of 1916

1916 lost films
1916 drama films
1916 films
American black-and-white films
American silent short films
1910s English-language films
Lost American films
Lost drama films
Universal Pictures short films
Films directed by Lloyd B. Carleton
1910s American films